Anaerocella delicata  is a Gram-negative, non-spore-forming, anaerobic and non-motile bacterium from the genus of Anaerocella which has been isolated from a methanogenic reactor of cattle waste in Hokkaido in Japan.

References

External links
Type strain of Anaerocella delicata at BacDive -  the Bacterial Diversity Metadatabase	

Bacteroidia
Bacteria described in 2013